Afalava is a surname. Notable people with the surname include:

Al Afalava (born 1987), American football player
Kesi Afalava (born 1961), Canadian football player